The Committed Men is a science fiction novel by M. John Harrison. It is Harrison's debut novel, and was originally published in 1971. The book is dedicated to Michael Moorcock and Moorcock's wife Hilary Bailey.

Synopsis 

In a dystopian Britain, social organization has collapsed, and the survivors, riddled with skin cancers, eke out a precarious scavenging existence in the ruins of the Great Society. A few bizarre communities try to maintain their structure in a chromium wilderness linked by crumbling motorways. But their rituals are meaningless clichés mouthed against the devastation. Only the roaming bands of hippie-style situationists have grasped that the old order, with its logic, its pseudo-liberalism and its immutable laws of cause and effect, has now been superseded. Among the mutants are a group of reptilian humans - alien, cancer-free but persecuted by the 'smoothskins'. When one of them is born of a human mother in Tinhouse, a group of humans sets off to deliver it to its own kind - a search of the committed men for the tribes of mutants.

Reception 
Writing in The Encyclopedia of Science Fiction, science fiction specialist John Clute wrote, "[The Committed Men] is an impressive Post-Holocaust story set in a fractured England, centering physically on the ruins of the motorways, and generating a powerful sense of entropic dismantlement."

A Kirkus reviewer wrote, "It erupts into the kind of savagery and grotesquerie that John Christopher used to specialize in, as Wendover, a doctor, finally finds himself trying to save a mutant baby from his own kind."

David Pringle called the novel "brief, bleak, derivative - but stylishly written."

Possible film adaptation 
In a 2018 interview Harrison revealed that he had been approached about a film adaption, which he declined. Explaining his decision: "I was less interested in shuffling and dealing than in saying something. I got an offer for the film rights of The Committed Men, but when I saw the treatment I found they had reversed its conclusions. Books are about meanings, not tropes, so I said no."

References 

1971 British novels
British science fiction novels
Doubleday (publisher) books
1971 debut novels